The 2008 China Baseball League season involves for the first time the champion of the league going to the Asia Series, instead of the all-star China Stars that were sent in previous years. For the first time in the history of the CBL, the season has been split into 2 sections. This is to accommodate the Beijing Olympics. The first half runs from April 11 to May 11, and then the season will resume on September 5 and conclude on October 12.

Standings

Southeast Division
As of May 11

Southwest Division
As of May 11

References

External links
Official website Chinese
Latest English summary 

2008
China Baseball League